Cryptotaenia japonica, also called East Asian wildparsley, Japanese cryptotaenia, Japanese honewort, white chervil mitsuba, Japanese wild parsley, stone parsley, honeywort, san ip, trefoil, and san ye qin (from ) is a plant species native to Japan, Korea, and China. The plant is edible and is commonly used as a garnish and root vegetable in Japan, and other Asian countries.

Culinary uses

Cryptotaenia japonica is raised as a seasoning (similar to angelica). Like parsley, the flavor is clean and refreshing with a slightly bitter taste which some describe as celery-like. The sprouts are used in salads and soup.

In Japan, it is commonly used as a garnish in soups or atop entrees or as a sushi ingredient. The white stems are blanched while they're tender, and have a taste similar to coriander. Two main regional varieties exist, the green Kansai type, and the white Kantō type.

Nutritional benefits
Mitsuba's dark green leaves, stems, and pods have an extensive nutritional profile, including high levels of calcium and vitamin C.

References

External links
 

Apioideae
Flora of China
Flora of Japan
Flora of Korea
Plants described in 1856